716 Berkeley (prov. designation:  or ) is a background asteroid from the central regions of the asteroid belt. It was discovered by Austrian astronomer Johann Palisa at the Vienna Observatory on 30 July 1911. It was named after the city of Berkeley, California, where the discoverer's colleague Armin Otto Leuschner (1868–1953) was the director of the local observatory.

Orbit and classification 

Berkeley is a non-family asteroid of the main belt's background population when applying the hierarchical clustering method to its proper orbital elements. It orbits the Sun in the central asteroid belt at a distance of 2.6–3.1 AU once every 4 years and 9 months (1,722 days; semi-major axis of 2.81 AU). Its orbit has an eccentricity of 0.09 and an inclination of 8° with respect to the ecliptic. The body's observation arc begins with its first observation at Heidelberg on 16 July 1906, five years prior to its official discovery observation by Johann Palisa at Vienna.

Naming 

According to Alexander Schnell, this minor planet was named by the discoverer after the U.S. city of Berkeley in California, where American astronomer and colleague Armin Otto Leuschner (1868–1953) was a long-time director at the Leuschner Observatory (then called Students' Observatory). Known for his books Celestial Mechanics and The Minor Planets of the Hecuba Group, Leuschner worked on the orbit determination of 719 Albert, which was originally discovered by Palisa in 1911 but remained a lost asteroid until 2000. The naming citation was not mentioned in The Names of the Minor Planets by Paul Herget in 1955. Palisa also named asteroid 718 Erida after Leuschner's daughter. The lunar crater Leuschner and asteroid 1361 Leuschneria, discovered by Eugène Delporte in 1935, were later named directly after the American astronomer.

Physical characteristics 

In both the Tholen  and SMASS classification, Berkeley is a common, stony S-type asteroid. It is also an S-type in the Bus–DeMeo classification, while in the Tholen- and SMASS-like taxonomic variants of the Small Solar System Objects Spectroscopic Survey (S3OS2), this asteroid is a K-type and Sq-subtype which transitions to the uncommon Q-type, respectively.

Rotation period 

In May 2009, a rotational lightcurve of Berkeley was obtained from photometric observations by American amateur astronomer Joe Garlitz at his Elgin Observatory in Oregon. Lightcurve analysis gave a rotation period of  hours with a brightness variation of  magnitude.

Diameter and albedo 

The Collaborative Asteroid Lightcurve Link derives an albedo of 0.2027 and a diameter of 21.38 kilometers based on an absolute magnitude of 10.7.

Notes

References

External links 
 Lightcurve Database Query (LCDB), at www.minorplanet.info
 Dictionary of Minor Planet Names, Google books
 Asteroids and comets rotation curves, CdR – Geneva Observatory, Raoul Behrend
 Discovery Circumstances: Numbered Minor Planets (1)-(5000) – Minor Planet Center
 
 

000716
Discoveries by Johann Palisa
Named minor planets
000716
000716
19110730